Thomas Gustafsson (also Morghult; born 29 March 1948) is a retired Swedish bobsledder. He finished 11th in the four man event at the 1972 Winter Olympics.

References

1948 births
Living people
Swedish male bobsledders
Olympic bobsledders of Sweden
Bobsledders at the 1972 Winter Olympics
Sportspeople from Stockholm
20th-century Swedish people